Charles Churcher (28 April 1873 – 17 September 1954) was a British sports shooter. He competed in the team 300 metre free rifle event at the 1908 Summer Olympics.

References

1873 births
1954 deaths
British male sport shooters
Olympic shooters of Great Britain
Shooters at the 1908 Summer Olympics
Sportspeople from Winchester